The Africa Safari Adventure Park (previously África mía Safari) is a private wildlife park of approximately 100 hectares, located in El Salto, south of the city of Liberia, Costa Rica. All animals have an African safari motif with enclosures for animals such as zebras, warthogs and giraffes, all of which multiply in the safari. The park also provides zip lines, nature trails through rain forest with a prominent waterfall and a lagoon for kayaking. The vast alluvial plain of the Guanacaste Province and swampy wetlands provide the Safari with an atmosphere that resembles that of certain plains of Africa.

Between 30–40 animals are born every year in the reserve. The animal park is the first in Central America with a giraffe born in captivity.

Exhibits
África mía Safari has only herbivore animals in exhibits. There are approximately 250 individual animals of 16 different species. 

 Spanish ibex
 Emu
 Blue peafowl
 Blue wildebeest (C. t. albojubatus)
 White-tailed deer
 Forest antelope
 Common eland
 Gemsbok
 Nilgai
 Reticulated giraffe
 Ankole-Watusi
 Chapman's zebra
 Grant's zebra
 Arabian camel
 Southern ostrich (S. c. australis)

See also 
 List of zoos by country: Costa Rica zoos

References 

Parks in Costa Rica
Urban public parks
Tourist attractions in Guanacaste Province
Botanical gardens in Costa Rica
Zoos in Costa Rica